Inteligencia de la Prefectura Naval Argentina (Argentine Naval Prefecture Intelligence) is the intelligence agency of the Argentine Naval Prefecture.

See also
List of Secretaries of Intelligence
Argentine intelligence agencies
National Intelligence System
National Intelligence School
Directorate of Judicial Surveillance
National Directorate of Criminal Intelligence
National Directorate of Strategic Military Intelligence

Argentine Naval Prefecture
Federal law enforcement agencies of Argentina
Argentine intelligence agencies